Labib al-Fata al-Saqlabi (or Labib of Tortosa) was the founder and first ruler of the Taifa of Tortosa from around  to . He was a Saqaliba, usually Slavic  children that were captured, castrated, sold as slaves in Spain, and educated in the Islamic culture and religion.

Some time after this he took power in the city of Tortosa, but was deposed when the city was briefly taken over by the Mundhir I of the Taifa of Zaragoza. However, due to aid from the Mubarak and Muzaffar of Taifa of Valencia he was able to regain his throne. During this time, the poet Ibn Darrach al-Qastalli dedicated a composition to him.  

Shortly after this Mubarak and Muzaffar died (possibly due to a rebellion instigated by Labib), and Labib became the ruler of the Taifa of Valencia. 

In  he became co-ruler of the Taifa of Valencia alongside Mujāhid al-ʿĀmirī. This arrangement only lasted until , when Labib was forced to leave Valencia and return to Tortosa. Soon after this Mujahid was replaced by Abd al-Aziz ibn Ámir as the ruler of The Taifa of Valencia.

In , Labib declared allegiance to Hisham II (who was most likely dead after the Berbers sacking Cordoba in 1013) as a symbol of his legitimacy, after the ruler of the Taifa of Seville, Abu al-Qasim Muhammad ibn Abbad claimed he had reappeared.

External links 

 Spanish Royal Academy of History biography page of Labib al-Fata al-Saqlabi

References

Taifa of Valencia
Taifa of Tortosa
11th-century rulers in Al-Andalus
Slavs of the medieval Islamic world